Nationality words link to articles with information on the nation's poetry or literature (for instance, Irish or French).

Events

Works published

Great Britain
Nicholas Breton, A Small Handful of Fragrant Flowers
 Thomas Churchyard, some prose but mostly poetry; in part, it recounts how Queen Elizabeth was received by the city of Bristow
 John Rolland, The Court of Venus

Other
 Philippe Desportes, an edition of his works; France
 Veronica Franco, Terze rime; Italian

Births
Death years link to the corresponding "[year] in poetry" article:
 August 14 – Robert Hayman (died 1629) poet, colonist and Proprietary Governor of Bristol's Hope colony in Newfoundland; his book, ''Qvodlibets ("What you will"), published in 1628, is the first book of English poetry written in what would become Canada.
 Also:
 Edmund Bolton (died c. 1633), English historian and poet, born this year by his own account
 Cyril Tourneur (died 1626), English playwright and poet
 Sir William Vaughan, "Orpheus junior" (died 1641), Welsh writer, poet and colonial investor
 Henry Willobie (died 1596), English
 Approximate date:
 Walter Quin (died 1640), Irish-born English court poet and author writing in English, Latin, French and Italian

Deaths
 April 10 (buried) – Anna Bijns (born 1493), Dutch
 August 14 – Diego Hurtado de Mendoza (born 1503), Spanish
 Also:
 Giovanni Battista Pigna (born 1530), Italian, Latin-language poet
 Adam Reusner (approximate date; born sometime from 1471 to 1496), German
 William Stevenson (born 1530), English poet, author and clergyman; presumed playwright

See also

 Poetry
 16th century in poetry
 16th century in literature
 Dutch Renaissance and Golden Age literature
 Elizabethan literature
 French Renaissance literature
 Renaissance literature
 Spanish Renaissance literature

Notes

16th-century poetry
Poetry